Kutb Khan was the commandant of Mahim, a village in Mumbai, India during the 15th century when the city was under the Gujarat Sultanate.

References
Greater Bombay District Gazetteer (Muhammedan Period)

History of Mumbai
15th-century Indian politicians